The Chapo Guide to Revolution: A Manifesto Against Logic, Facts, and Reason is a 2018 satirical book by hosts of the American political humor podcast Chapo Trap House, published by Touchstone. The book debuted at number 6 on the New York Times Best Seller list in the Hardcover Nonfiction section.

Content
The book deals with American history and capitalism, and "skewers" the two main American political parties. It also features cartoons from Eli Valley. The book originally contained parodies of several comic strips, but they were cut for legal reasons.

Reception
The book received positive reviews in Salon, Paste, Newsweek and Harper's Magazine. In a negative review for Politico, Bill Scher said The Chapo Guide to Revolution was possibly the "stupidest book ever written about socialism."

References

External links
 
 The Chapo Guide to Revolution at Simon & Schuster

2018 non-fiction books
Political satire books
American political books
Books about socialism
Simon & Schuster books